Ray A. Brownell (June 1876 – August 9, 1954) was a Michigan politician.

Political life
Brownell was elected as the Mayor of City of Flint in 1929 for a single 1-year term by the City Commission.  He was last of the directly elected Flint Mayors until 1975.

References

Mayors of Flint, Michigan
1876 births
1954 deaths
20th-century American politicians